Clifton is a Franco-Belgian comics series in the humorous spy-genre, featuring the exploits of Colonel Sir Harold Wilberforce Clifton. It was created by Raymond Macherot in 1959, and has since passed on to other artists and writers. Over the fifty years of publication of the Clifton series, approximately twenty albums and twenty smaller stories have been published, totalling about 800 pages.

Character
A British colonel, retired from MI5, though sometimes still active for the British government, Clifton functions as an amateur sleuth, and his phlegmatic approach to stress leads to humorous situations. Harold Clifton lives in Puddington, near London, supported by housekeeper Miss Partridge, who makes a prize-winning goulash. Clifton drives a red MG TD from the early fifties, which gets mangled in most stories, but is repaired regardless of cost. Clifton's hobbies include Boy Scouting (he's Boy Scoutmaster Singing Heron), cats, and collecting cigar wraps. In Passé Composé it was established that Clifton served in the RAF as a group captain during World War II before joining the Secret Service. He also ascended to knighthood in the issue Mortelle Saison for saving a member of the Royal family.

Clifton's amateur sleuthing leads him to investigate many cases, often with the police or MI5. His main contact at MI5 is Colonel Donald Spruce who often calls on him to deal with delicate missions. Spruce is the sort of man who would be perfectly capable of handling the missions himself if not for a leg injury which has left him partly disabled.

Publication history

It was originally Raymond Macherot who created the Colonel Clifton character, and the first story was published in the Franco-Belgian comics magazine Tintin on 16 December 1959. In preliminary studies, Macherot had used Colonel Horatio Amaory Crickett as a working name, but before the first story decided on Colonel Clifton instead. Clifton's first names Harold Wilberforce were not mentioned until the second story. After three stories, published in 1959–1960, Macherot went on to do other work, and eventually left Tintin for the competitor Spirou magazine, leaving behind his Tintin-owned work. Clifton was shelved for six years.

In 1969, artist Jo-El Azara and writer Greg revived the series with the short story Les lutins diaboliques. In 1972, writer Greg and new artist Turk did the story Le voleur qui rit. In 1974, artist Turk and new writer De Groot (who had collaborated on the Clifton short-story Le mystère de la voix qui court in 1970), started the story Alias Lord X, and that duo began a long-lasting collaboration on eight Clifton volumes.

In 1983, Bédu took over the artwork from Turk and worked with De Groot until the 1990s. In 1991, Bédu became responsible for both artwork and scenario with the story Le clan Mc Gregor, the last story serialised in French Tintin, and continued to work alone for the following two stories published directly to albums.

In 2003, after a long inactive period, Rodrigue collaborated with Bob de Groot who returned to write Clifton scripts, and two volumes have been published since.

Timeline of major stories

*Denotes original year of publication until Tintin ceased to be published, and Clifton no longer serialised

Publications in magazines and other media
The cartoonists worked with original French language stories, whereas all were published simultaneously in French and Dutch, the two main Belgian languages, in the weekly magazines Tintin / Kuifje (French / Dutch edition of the same magazine), Junior (French) and Ons Volkske (Dutch), all published by Lombard Editions in Brussels. Clifton also ran in other magazines, across Europe such as the German publications Zack and YPS.

Beside French and Dutch, the stories have been translated into Finnish, Portuguese, Danish, Swedish, Norwegian, English and German (where in most publications Clifton is named Percy Pickwick).

In 1984, a six minutes long Clifton theatrical animated short film was made by Belvision Studios as one of the studios' final productions in the 1980s, the film department of Lombard. The cartoon was based on the short story "Un pépin pour Clifton" (French) / "Onder Cliftons Paraplu" or "Pech voor Clifton" (Dutch) (Lit. "Bad luck for Clifton"/"Under Clifton's umbrella") by Turk and De Groot. The animation was produced by Michel Leloupe, with Anthony Hamilton voicing Clifton.

English translations
The series have been translated into English by Cinebook Ltd, a British publisher specializing in Franco-Belgian comics. So far, eight books have been translated.

 My Dear Wilkinson, 2005, 
 The Laughing Thief, 2005, 
 7 days to die, 2006, 
 The Black Moon, 2007, 
 Jade, 2008,  
 Kidnapping, 2009, 
 Elementary, My Dear Clifton, 2014, 
 Sir Jason, 2018,

References

External links
 English publisher of Clifton - Cinebook Ltd
 Clifton publications in Belgian Tintin and French Tintin BDoubliées 
 Clifton.nl (fansite) 
 Lombard Editions, publishers

Belgian comic strips
Bandes dessinées
Belgian comics characters
Lombard Editions titles
1959 comics debuts
Comics characters introduced in 1959
Detective comics
Humor comics
Spy comics
Fictional amateur detectives
Fictional English people
Comics set in London
Comics set in the United Kingdom
Male characters in comics